The Attorney General or the Prosecutor General of Maldives is the Maldivian government's chief legal advisor, and its primary lawyer. The Prosecutor General is usually a highly respected Senior Advocate, and is appointed by the President. The incumbent Attorney General is Ibrahim Riffath.

List of attorneys general

External links
Attorney General's Office

Government of the Maldives